The 1955–56 Beitar Jerusalem season was the club's 20th season since its establishment, in 1936, and 8th since the establishment of the State of Israel.

At the start of the season, the league which started during the previous season was completed, with the club finishing 11th (out of 14), which meant the club had to compete in a promotion/relegation play-offs against the 12th placed club, Hapoel Kfar Saba, and the two Liga Bet winners, Maccabi Jaffa and Hapoel Kiryat Haim. The club lost all three play-offs matches and was relegated to the second division, which was renamed Liga Alef, and played in this division during the remainder of the season, finishing 10th (out of 12), which meant that the club had to face another promotion/relegation play-offs, which were delayed and were played at the beginning of the next season.

Match results

Legend

1954–55 Liga Alef
The league began on 6 February 1955, and by the time the previous season ended, only 20 rounds of matches were completed, with the final 6 rounds being played during September and October 1955.

Final table

Matches

Results by match

Promotion/relegation play-offs

Table

Beitar Jerusalem relegated to Liga Alef

Matches

1955–56 Liga Alef

Final table

Matches

Results by match

Promotion/relegation play-offs

Table

References

 

Beitar Jerusalem F.C. seasons
Beitar Jerusalem